Best Hits Live: Save the Children Speed Live 2003 is a collection of live songs recorded by Japanese J-pop girlband Speed's during one of the concerts they performed in 2003. This album was released on February 25, 2004, as part of the "Save the Children" charity project.

Track listing
"Be My Love"
"Go!Go!Heaven"
"Steady"
"All My True Love"
"Snow Kiss" (Unplugged)
"My Graduation" (Unplugged)
"Alive"
"Walking in the Rain"
"Long Way Home"
"Stars to Shine Again"
"Body & Soul"
"White Love"
"Breakin' Out to the Morning"
"Wake Me Up!"
  — (Tropical Night)

Speed (Japanese band) albums
2004 live albums
Save the Children